Bernard Anthony Hopkins White (born January 13, 1973) is an American-Spanish retired professional basketball player. Hopkins is a 6'6", 235-pound power forward. He played college ball at Hagerstown Community College for two seasons before transferring to Virginia Commonwealth University (VCU) for his final two. As a senior in 1995–96, Hopkins was named the 1996 CAA men's basketball tournament MVP as well as the Colonial Athletic Association Men's Basketball Player of the Year.

College career
Hopkins, a native of Baltimore, Maryland, was a standout basketball player in high school and graduated in 1992. He spent his first two seasons playing approximately one hour away in nearby Hagerstown at its community college. He then transferred to VCU to play for the Rams, and in just two years became a highly decorated player in the school's history. During his junior season, Hopkins shot 58.5% from the field and finished with the 25th best shooting percentage in the country. He then broke out during his senior year when he scored 538 points, grabbed 333 rebounds (third highest ever at VCU), compiled 19 double-doubles and guided the Rams to both the conference regular season and tournament championships. In the first round of the 1996 NCAA Men's Division I Basketball Tournament, which the Rams would lose to Mississippi State by seven, Hopkins was named the CBS Chevrolet Player of the Game. Also as a senior, he became the CAA's first player to record 500+ points, 300+ rebounds, 70+ assists and shoot better than 50% from the field in a single season. He was named the CAA Tournament MVP as well as the CAA Player of the Year. For his career, Hopkins scored 950 career points.

Professional career
Hopkins was invited to the Portsmouth Invitational Tournament following his senior season, the only postseason camp conducted for just the top NCAA seniors. It is a chance to impress National Basketball Association (NBA) scouts to possibly get drafted in that respective year's NBA draft. Hopkins was named the MVP of the tournament yet failed to get drafted a month later. Instead, the Continental Basketball Association's Yakima Sun Kings selected him third overall in their draft. He played for the Sun Kings for one season where he was named the Rookie of the Year and got selected to the all-rookie and all-league teams.

Since 1998–99 he has played for various teams, all in Spain, and became a naturalized citizen of that country. His career highlights include being named a Liga ACB All-Star in 1999 and 2001, a five-time Player of the Month and a 24-time Player of the Week.

On November 6, 2012, Blu:sens Monbús, his last team in Spain, announced it will retire his number 4 at the end of the 2012–13 season.

Personal
Hopkins became a naturalized citizen of Spain during his time playing in that country.

References

External links
Liga ACB profile

1973 births
Living people
American expatriate basketball people in Spain
Basketball players from Baltimore
CB Gran Canaria players
CB Valladolid players
Gipuzkoa Basket players
Junior college men's basketball players in the United States
Liga ACB players
Naturalised citizens of Spain
Obradoiro CAB players
Power forwards (basketball)
Spanish men's basketball players
Tenerife CB players
Valencia Basket players
VCU Rams men's basketball players
Yakima Sun Kings players
American men's basketball players